Ardtalla is a place name and estate in the southeast coastal area of Islay, Scotland. The name derives from Gaelic Àird, a "point", and talla, a now obsolete word for rock, not "high grave" as suggested by some. A well-defined track emanates from the Ardtalla Estate encountering coastal scenery and an Iron Age fort.

Historical perspective
According to Roger Redfern, Saint Columba landed nearby at Ardmore Point on his historic journey from Ireland around the Hebrides. In Redfern's book, Walking in the Hebrides, he details scenic and historic elements in and around the Ardtalla Estate.

Recorded mention of Ardtalla traces back at least as far as the latter 18th century. As early as during the 18th century, the literature notes that local people on Islay did not consider Ardtalla a remote location, ostensibly due to the level of improvement of the coastal access road connecting Ardtalla to Port Ellen.

In music
Ardtalla has been the subject of musical compositions, notably including James MacMillan's composition The Road to Ardtalla composed for chamber sextet in 1983 and premiered at the Manchester University Concert Hall at the Manchester University on 6 October 1987.

See also
 Claggain Bay
 Kildalton Cross

Line notes

References
 Daniel Campbell and Freda Ramsay. 1991. The day book of Daniel Campbell of Shawfield: 1767 : with relevant papers, 304 pages
 Frank Fraser Darling. 1955. West Highland survey: an essay in human ecology, 438 pages
 Colin MacGilp MacDonald. 1961. The county of Argyll, p. 344 of 396 pages
 James MacMillan. 1983. http://www.boosey.com/cr/music/James-MacMillan-The-Road-to-Ardtalla/242 The Road to Ardtalla Musical score
 Norman S. Newton. 1995. Islay, page 104 of 112 pages
 Royal Commission on the Ancient and Historical Monuments of Scotland. 1984. Argyll: Islay, Jura, Colonsay & Oronsay, 373 pages
 John McLean. 1887. Translations of the names of places contained in the deeds of entail of the Breadbane Estates
 Roger Redfern. 1998. Walking in the Hebrides, 192 pages

Villages in Islay
Highland Estates